Li Europan lingues is a quotation in Occidental (Interlingue), an international auxiliary language devised by Edgar von Wahl in 
1922. It is used in some HTML templates as a fill-in or placeholder text.

Text

When used as placeholder text,  is usually one or two paragraphs and reads as follows:

English translation

The European languages are members of the same family. Their separate existence is a myth. For science, music, sport, etc, Europe uses the same vocabulary. The languages only differ in their grammar, their pronunciation and their most common words. Everyone realizes why a new common language would be desirable: one could refuse to pay expensive translators.

To achieve this, it would be necessary to have uniform grammar, pronunciation and more common words. If several languages coalesce, the grammar of the resulting language is more simple and regular than that of the individual languages. The new common language will be more simple and regular than the existing European languages. It will be as simple as Occidental; in fact, it will be Occidental. To an English person, it will seem like simplified English, as a skeptical Cambridge friend of mine told me that Occidental is.

History and discovery of Li Europan lingues text

The original text of Li Europan lingues comes from an article written in 1933 for the journal Cosmoglotta entitled Occidental es inevitabil (Occidental is inevitable), in which S.W. Beer from the universities of London and Cambridge wrote a letter explaining that he supported the language for practical reasons because he believed it would inevitably become Europe's lingua franca.

The text of Li Europan lingues is found in many HTML templates and through copying and uploading of templates this phrase seems to have found its use in many websites.

Don Harlow posted a message to the Auxlang List on 5 August 2006, mentioning its appearance in the "CSS Cookbook" from O'Reilly by Christopher Schmitt, and in templates of webpages which implement CSS.

See also
Lorem ipsum
The quick brown fox jumps over the lazy dog

References

External links
 Occidental - A small collection of Occidental pages, including the classic text Ex li paper-corb by Farfarello, and mention of the link between Lorem ipsum and Occidental.

Filler text
Interlingue